Casper is a freestyle skateboarding trick that was invented by Bobby "Casper" Boyden in the late 1970s. Bo removes his back foot from the board and uses his front foot to turn the board back to its normal position with a motion that resembles an impossible. The board is turned upside down with the tip of the tail on the ground acting as a fulcrum, the front foot under the front of the board holding it up acting as the effort, and the back foot resting on top of the back truck as the load. Note that the skateboarder's feet never touch the ground during this trick.

A modern casper is performed like a kickflip, but the skateboarder catches the board after it has flipped upside down and lands in the casper stance. A casper can be performed either when standing still or when moving. The balancing can also involve sliding on the tip of the tail. Exiting the trick can involve rotating, flipping or wrapping the board around the foot. It is recommended that beginners learning to incorporate the Casper initiate the move while riding fakie; riding tail-first allows the use of momentum to assist in lifting the nose of the board.

The reverse of this trick is the Anti-casper which is the same principle only applied a half-impossible into a casper on the nose of the board.

A comprehensive demonstration of the Casper, including complex variations on the theme and tricks involving the Casper can be seen in the Rodney Mullen segment of the 1994 film Second Hand Smoke, by Plan B.

There are many types of "casper tricks", such as the casper slide (A trick in which a rider does a half-kickflip so that they are in casper stance, then sliding/dragging the tail of the board on the ground so that the rider essentially slides), and the casper/hospital flip (where the rider does a half-kickflip, then uses their feet to spin the board in a 180 while the board also flips back to normal position). There is much debate whether the casper and hospital flip are the same. However, the casper flip uses both feet to spin the board, while the hospital flip only uses one foot, similar to a shuvit.

References

Skateboarding tricks